The 33rd TCA Awards were held on August 5, 2017, in a ceremony hosted by Kristin Chenoweth at The Beverly Hilton in Beverly Hills, California. The nominees were announced by the Television Critics Association on June 19, 2017.

Winners and nominees

Multiple wins

The following shows received multiple wins:

Shows with multiple nominations

The following shows received multiple nominations:

References

External links
 Official website

2016 television awards
2016 in American television
TCA Awards ceremonies